Andrija Hebrang may refer to:
 Andrija Hebrang (politician, born 1899) (died 1949), Croatian politician
 Andrija Hebrang (politician, born 1946), Croatian politician and son of the above